{{Infobox comic book title 
|title = Black Canary
|image =
|caption =
|schedule =
|ongoing =
|publisher = National Allied Publications
|date = (vol. 1)November 1991 – February 1992(vol. 2)January 1993 – December 1993 (vol. 3)Early September 2007 – Late October 2007 (vol. 4)August 2015 – August 2016 
|startmo =
|startyr =
|endmo =
|endyr =
|issues = (vol.1)4(vol.2)12(vol.3)4(vol. 4)12|Superhero = y
|main_char_team =
|writers = 
|inkers =
|creators =
|TPB = Golden Age Black Canary Volume 1
|ISBN =
|TPB1 =
|ISBN1 =
|TPB2 =
|ISBN2 =
|TPB3 =
|ISBN3 =
}}Black Canary' first appeared in Flash Comics #86 as a guest hero/villain for character Johnny Thunder appearing for five issues until gaining her own feature starting with issue #92 through the series' end in #104.

Starman and Black Canary
Black Canary headlined two issues of The Brave and the Bold with Starman in a trial run from issues #61 and #62 that did not lead to a series.

Unpublished 1984 miniseries
A miniseries by writer Greg Weisman and artist Mike Sekowsky was planned in 1984. The first issue of the series was pencilled, but the project was ultimately shelved due to the character being used in writer/artist Mike Grell's high-profile Green Arrow: The Longbow Hunters series. Elements from the ill-fated project were used for Weisman's DC Showcase: Green Arrow short film.

Volume 1
Volume 1 of Black Canary (November 1991 – February 1992) was a four–issue miniseries written by Sarah Byam and drawn by Trevor Von Eeden with inking by Dick Giordano.

Volume 2
After the success of the miniseries Byam and Von Eeden returned for a monthly series that ran for 12 issues (January 1993 – December 1993) before its cancellation.

Volume 3
Volume 3 was a four-issue miniseries (early September 2007 – late October 2007) that chronicled Black Canary's adventures with her daughter Sin escaping the clutches of the League of Assassins. The series was written by Tony Bedard with art by Paulo Siqueira. It filled the story gap between Black Canary's appearances in Birds of Prey and Green Arrow.

Green Arrow and Black Canary

Volume 4
In February 2015, DC announced a new volume of Black Canary to be starting in June of that year, after the conclusion of Convergence. Written by Brenden Fletcher and illustrated by Annie Wu, Black Canary'' was one of the first DC titles to be published as part of the DC You initiative. The series was cancelled as of issue #12 (Aug. 2016), when DC rebooted its continuity with Rebirth.

Collected editions

References

1991 comics debuts
1992 comics endings
1993 comics debuts
1993 comics endings
2007 comics debuts
2007 comics endings
2015 comics debuts
2016 comics endings
Black Canary
DC Comics titles